Lowndes County is the name of several counties in the United States:

 Lowndes County, Alabama 
 Lowndes County, Georgia 
 Lowndes County, Mississippi